Est 141.701 to 141.742 were a class of 42 suburban Mikado (2-8-2T) tank locomotives of the Compagnie des chemins de fer de l'Est. The Est placed then in power class (série) 12s. At nationalisation in 1938, they passed to the SNCF who renumbered them 1-141.TC.701 to 1-141.TC.742.

Origins 

Two prototype locomotives were built in the company's Épernay Worksops in 1930; they were followed by a batch of forty locomotives from Société française de constructions mécaniques delivered between May 1932 and February 1933

Description 
The locomotives were three-cylinder, simple expansion type, with Belpaire fireboxes.

Service history 
The locomotives were used to pull suburban trains from Gare de l"Est until 1955, when electrification made them redundant.
In May 1955, seven locomotives were transferred to the Batignolles depot on the Région Ouest where they were renumbered 3-141.TD.703, 709, 720, 736, 740, 741 and 742. They were then used on the same duties as the nearly identical 3-141.TD class locomotives, of which the État had bought forty as 42-101 to 42-140.

Preservation 
One locomotive has been preserved: 3-141.TD.740, ex 1-141.TC.740, née 141.740. Since February 1982, it has been in the custody of the Chemin de Fer Touristique Limousin Périgord, where it is used to pull special trains.

In October 1987, it was designated a Monument historique

Models 
The 141.700 have been reproduced in HO scale as an etched brass kit by LocoSet Loisir (Artmétal-LSL), and by Fulgurex in 2005.

References 

Steam locomotives of France
2-8-2T locomotives
Railway locomotives introduced in 1930
Standard gauge locomotives of France
141701
Passenger locomotives